Antonio Ortega Martínez (born 28 July 1954) is a Mexican politician from the Party of the Democratic Revolution. From 2006 to 2009 he served as Deputy of the LX Legislature of the Mexican Congress representing Aguascalientes.

References

1954 births
Living people
Politicians from Aguascalientes
Party of the Democratic Revolution politicians
21st-century Mexican politicians
Members of the Congress of Aguascalientes
Deputies of the LX Legislature of Mexico
Members of the Chamber of Deputies (Mexico) for Aguascalientes